Taloon's Great Adventure: Mystery Dungeon is part of the larger Mystery Dungeon franchise, featuring Torneko, the merchant from Dragon Quest IV, and his adventures around the Mystery Dungeon in search of items.

Taloon's Great Adventure is the first spin-off game in the Dragon Quest franchise. After failed attempts on creating a roguelike game in a home console, such as Sega's Fatal Labyrinth and Dragon Crystal, the game was a success with over 800,000 copies sold, which led to Chunsoft turning it into a franchise and worked on both the game's indirect sequel and the company's original series, Mystery Dungeon 2: Shiren the Wanderer, in 1995.

Gameplay

The gameplay is similar to roguelike-style PC games. The main similarity is the heavy use of randomized dungeons and effects. The main character of the game is Torneko, originally localized as Taloon in North America, a merchant and playable character from Dragon Quest IV. The player continues his story from Dragon Quest IV, where he wishes to make his store famous and ventures into mystery dungeons to retrieve items to stock in his store.

While Torneko explores the dungeons, he collects items and fights monsters, similar to ones found in Dragon Quest games. If he leaves the dungeon, he can sell off the items he found. He can also equip certain items. By saving up money, he can improve his home and shop.

Story
Torneko, a weapon merchant for hire, lives in Lakanaba with his wife, Tessie, and son, Tipper. He has one dream: to own his own shop and make it the greatest one. As such, he sets out on a journey, searching for an iron safe and works on other various jobs, and finally opens a store thanks to the help of his wife. Soon after, Torneko hears a rumor that there is an amazing treasure in a mysterious dungeon that no one has ever seen. However, he is worried about the store and his family. Tessie understands him and decides to go alongside him to the "Mystery Dungeon". The family travel across oceans and mountains for years before finally arriving near the dungeon. He sets up store near a single large tree in a new village near it.

Torneko tries to get permission from the King of the land to explore the dungeon, but he refuses to budge, saying it is too dangerous. However, he does not back down, and the King promises to give him permission only if he can retrieve the jewel box from the "Small Mystery Dungeon". Torneko brings back the King's jewelry box and gets permission to explore the "Mystery Dungeon". After successfully obtaining the permission, he ventures into the dungeon, gradually expanding his store with the income he earns from selling the items he brings back from his repeated adventures. Finally, he succeeds in bringing back the "Box of Happiness"; a rumored treasure hidden in the dungeon's innermost depths. When he opens the box, a small melody begins to play, which reveals it functions as a music box. The box, placed in Torneko's house, then plays a beautiful music which makes everyone near the store, including his family happy. Thus, Torneko's goal of obtaining the treasure in the "Mystery Dungeon" was realized. While the story concludes here, he continues to explore a new "More Mysterious Dungeon".

While it is unknown how many years went by between the events of Dragon Quest IV and this game, there is a continuing linear story thereafter; Torneko: The Last Hope happens half a year later, and Dragon Quest Characters: Torneko no Daibōken 3 seven years later.

Development
Taloon's Great Adventure was developed by Chunsoft, the developers for the first five Dragon Quest games. It was the first game in the Mystery Dungeon series of roguelike games, of which over thirty have been produced, including five Dragon Quest spin-offs. Letting players explore a familiar setting was part of lowering the difficulty and trying to broaden the appeal of the genre. 

After the launch of the Super Famicom and finishing development for Dragon Quest V in 1992, Chunsoft ceased working on the Dragon Quest series and began working on other genres, now known as the Sound Novel and Mystery Dungeon series. The series was based on the 1980's game Rogue, which has spawned its own genre called roguelike. For a week, Koichi Nakamura, founder of Chunsoft and co-creator of the Dragon Quest series, played Rogue at the recommendation of a colleague, Seiichiro Nagahata, trying to understand the game's appeal, and concluded the high degree of challenge made the game rewarding. Tasked with creating one of the first "rogue-like" games for the Super Famicom, a home console, instead of a computer, the team decided to use characters from a recognizable franchise in Japan. Nakamura initially asked Yuji Horii, scenarist and creator of the Dragon Quest series, for permission to use the Dragon Quest games as the template, including Torneko, the merchant from Dragon Quest IV, on which he was given permission soon after. Unlike today's game software development, as soon as Nakamura expressed his desire to work on this project, he started brainstorming without going through the approval process or budget, which resulted in an unclear work division. When he explained the system introduced in Rogue, which was used as a reference prior to development, there was a considerable resistance from employees around him; as he talked about it, other staff members gradually left in disagreeing with this idea.

One major change from the normal Dragon Quest game was the replacement of the hero, who normally had a grand mission to save the world, with the kind of person who would go hunting for treasure in dungeons. For this reason, Nakamura chose Torneko, the well-loved shopkeeper from Dragon Quest IV, imagining that he was exploring for items to put in his shop. The "permadeath" feature, seen in most roguelike games where the game starts over if the player character dies, was adjusted so the player does not start from scratch and has a chance to return to the last dungeon he fainted at. A hunger system was added in the game so the player has to pay attention to the adventure through the dungeon, as if it is empty, Torneko's HP decreases on each turns. Furthermore, an earthquake was also added in dungeons, as acting against players who would stall and farm in one floor, by forcefully drop Torneko to the next floor once the player reaches the maximum amount of turns. Finally, music and sound effects were introduced in this game, which was not common in the roguelike genre at the time. Most of the tweaks given in this roguelike game were later reused for future Mystery Dungeon games, with further adjustments for each of them.

It was published in 1993 and became the first video game to bear the "Mystery Dungeon" moniker. Nakamura conceived the series as Chunsoft's first original work. A PAL prototype originating from Germany was unearthed, proving that it was far in development. Its owner got it while working at Nintendo of Europe, in Germany. The same prototype was later put on sale on eBay in 2022, including in-game screenshots and an official translation named Taloon's Great Adventure: Mystery Dungeon.

Music
As with other games in the Dragon Quest series, the musical score for the game was written by Koichi Sugiyama. Sony Records released the soundtrack, titled Suite Torneko's Great Adventure: Musical Chemistry, on October 21, 1993 in Japan. It contains eight arranged tracks performed by a chamber orchestra, as well as three tracks containing original game music. The album was reprinted on October 7, 2009. Two pieces of music from the game were performed by the Tokyo City Philharmonic Orchestra at the Game Music Concert 3, the year of the game's release.

Release
The game was promoted with an exceptionally high-budget television commercial. It had a running time of 30 seconds (unusually long for Japanese commercials of the time) and consisted almost entirely of claymation footage filmed to run at 24 frames per second. Taloon's Great Adventure was released on September 19, 1993, exclusively in Japan, with a catchphrase that will be re-used throughout the series; "The RPG that can be played 1000 times".

Reception

In November 1993, Famitsu magazine's Reader Cross Review gave the game a 8 out of 10 and it earned the Gold Hall of Fame. It won the Grand Prize at the 1993 Japan Software Awards. In 2006, the game was voted number 78 by the readers of Famitsu magazine in its top 100 games of all time. Although it has sold less than the Dragon Quest'''s mainline titles, the success behind its sales is due to its crossover with the latter, which is a cultural phenomenon in Japan. Eventually, the game reached over 800,000 copies sold in its lifetime.

The game spawned two sequels starring Torneko, Torneko: The Last Hope in 1999 and Dragon Quest Characters: Torneko no Daibōken 3 in 2002, and a follow-up, Dragon Quest: Shōnen Yangus to Fushigi no Dungeon in 2006, where Torneko would appear as a cameo instead of the protagonist. And indeed, the game became the first of the over thirty Mystery Dungeon'' rogue-like series.

Notes

References

External links

Role-playing video games
Chunsoft games
Japan-exclusive video games
Super Nintendo Entertainment System games
Super Nintendo Entertainment System-only games
Top-down video games
1993 video games
Video games developed in Japan
Video games scored by Koichi Sugiyama
Video games using procedural generation
Mystery Dungeon
Single-player video games
Roguelike video games
Dragon Quest spin-off games